Beyond the Boundary is a 2013 supernatural Japanese anime series based on the light novels written by Nagomu Torii and illustrated by Chise Kamoi. One day high-school student Akihito Kanbara instinctively goes to save his fellow schoolmate, Mirai Kuriyama who he thinks is committing suicide. However Mirai stabs Akihito with a sword made of her own blood and discovers that Akihito is an immortal "half-youmu"—the offspring of a supernatural creature called a youmu and a human. After learning that Mirai is a Spirit World Warrior and lacks the confidence to slay youmu, the two form an unlikely pair when Akihito decides to help her regain her confidence to kill youmu so that she may stop attempting to kill him as practice.

The twelve episode anime was produced by Kyoto Animation, directed by Taichi Ishidate and written by Jukki Hanada, with character designs by Miku Kadowaki, art direction by Mikiko Watanabe, sound direction by Yota Tsuruoka and soundtrack music by Hikaru Nanase. The series premiered on Tokyo MX between October 2 and December 18, 2013, and later aired on ABC, TVA, BS11 and Animax along with online streaming on TBS On Demand and Niconico. Crunchyroll simulcasted the series with English subtitles in North America. An original video animation episode was later released on July 2, 2014. Pony Canyon released the series in Japan on seven Blu-ray and DVD volumes between January 8 and July 2, 2014. The anime was licensed by Sentai Filmworks in North America and was dubbed and produced by Sentai Studios in Houston, Texas. Hanabee Entertainment later licensed the series for a digital release in Australia.

An original net animation titled Beyond the Boundary Idol Trial! was released on YouTube between November 18 and December 16, 2013. The mini-series follows super deformed versions of Mitsuki, Mirai, Sakura, and Ai as they put wrong-doers on trial and sentence them following an idol stage performance.



Episode list

Beyond the Boundary Idol Trial!

Home media
Pony Canyon released the complete Beyond the Boundary series in Japan on six Blu-ray and DVD volumes between January 8 and June 4, 2014. The seventh volume included the original first three episodes of the Idol Trial ONA and two additional ones. Sentai Filmworks will release the series in Region 1 on Blu-ray and DVD format on October 13, 2015. In addition, 'Mini Theatre' episodes were included with each of the 7 volumes.

Notes

References

External links
Official anime website 

Beyond the Boundary